Onychostoma alticorpus (common name: Taiwan ku fish) is a species of ray-finned fish in the family Cyprinidae. It can grow to  TL, but commonly only to about half of that.

Onychostoma alticorpus is endemic to Taiwan where it is known from only five river basins. It is a herbivorous species that occurs in streams. As with other riverine species, its habitat can be threatened by siltation, dam building, and pollution.

References

Cyprinid fish of Asia
Freshwater fish of Taiwan
Endemic fauna of Taiwan
Fish described in 1920
Taxonomy articles created by Polbot
alticorpus